Anderson Doniphan Rice (1818 – October 10, 1869) was the third mayor of Dallas, Texas, from 1858 to 1859.  A physician by profession, he also served as county treasurer (1852–1854) and justice of Precinct No. 1 (1864–1866).

Biography

Rice was born in Kentucky to Hudson M. Rice and Rachel Murphy  He married Ann Frances Russell on June 24, 1852, in Dallas.  After her death, he married Mrs. Zesiah Beeler Dillon on June 26, 1856, in Dallas. He and his second wife had three children: Hudson D. Rice, Lena V. Rice, and Harriet V. Rice.

When Dallas held its first election for mayor, both Dr. Samuel B. Pryor and Dr. A. D. Rice were on the ballot for the office.  Dr. Pryor won that first election in 1856. In August 1858, Dr. Rice was elected the fourth mayor.

In 1861 Dr. Rice joined Company E of the Third Texas Cavalry as a surgeon, at the rank of either Captain  or Private (sources differ).  He died in 1869 and was buried in the Masonic Cemetery in Dallas.  He was also a member of Tannehill Lodge No. 52, A. F. and A. M.

References

1818 births
1869 deaths
Mayors of Dallas
19th-century American politicians